Kentucky Route 293 (KY 293) is a  state highway in Kentucky that runs from Kentucky Routes 93 and 1055 southeast of Eddyville to Kentucky Route 270 northeast of Providence via Princeton and Providence.

Route description
KY 293 starts in south Eddyville at a junction with KY 93 and KY 1055. Shortly after its beginning KY 93 intersects Interstate 24 (I-24) at that freeway's exit 45 interchange. It enters Caldwell County after leaving Saratoga and intersects KY 139 and KY 91 in downtown Princeton. It then runs concurrently with U.S. Route 62 (US 62) in downtown and breaks off US 62 to traverse the exit 81 interchange with I-69.

KY 293 continues on to intersect KY 70 in northeastern Caldwell County just north of Needmore. KY 293 briefly enters the northwestern sliver of Hopkins County before entering Webster County and reaching the city of Providence.

KY 293 reaches its northern terminus at the intersection with KY 270 near Lisman.

Major intersections

Lyon County + KY 139 Overlap + US 62 Overlap + KY 70 Overlap + Caldwell County + Hopkins County + KY 109 Overlap + KY 120 Overlap + KY 670 Overlap = 30.524
KY 109 Overlap = 0.470

References

0293
0293
0293
0293
0293